Beneficial may refer to:

Organizations
 Beneficial Corporation, a consumer finance company founded in 1914 that was ultimately bought by HSBC Corporation
 Beneficial Loan Society, the former name of Beneficial Corporation
 Beneficial Finance, a former division of HSBC Finance, and a part of their acquisition of Beneficial Corporation
 Beneficial Bank, a full-service bank founded in 1853 operating in Pennsylvania and New Jersey
 Beneficial Financial Group, an insurance and financial services company founded in 1905 and run by The Church of Jesus Christ of Latter-day Saints
 Beneficial State Bank, a community development bank founded in 2007 that serves California and the Pacific Northwest

Biology
 Beneficial organism, any organism that benefits the growing process of another species
 Beneficial insect
 Beneficial weed
 Beneficial Microbes, a scientific journal covering research on microbes beneficial to the health and well-being of humans and animals

Law
 Beneficial interest
 Beneficial owner
 Beneficial ownership
 Beneficial use